Elections to the Uttar Pradesh Legislative Assembly were held in November 1989, to elect members of the 425 constituencies in Uttar Pradesh, India. The Janata Dal won the most seats as well as the popular vote and its leader, Mulayam Singh Yadav was appointed as the new Chief Minister.

After the passing of The Delimitation of Parliamentary and Assembly Constituencies Order, 1976, the number of constituencies in Uttar Pradesh was set as 425.

Results

Elected Members

References

State Assembly elections in Uttar Pradesh
Uttar Pradesh